Andrew Peter Nunn  (born 30 July 1957) is a British Anglican priest. Since 2012, he has been the Dean of Southwark in the Church of England.

Early life
Nunn was born on 30 July 1957 in Wigston Magna, Leicestershire. From 1975 to 1979, he studied public administration at Leicester Polytechnic, graduating with a Bachelor of Arts (BA (Hons)) degree. He then worked for a year as a rent collector for the Housing Department of Wellingborough Borough Council in Northamptonshire.

In 1980, he entered the College of the Resurrection, Mirfield, to train for ordination. During this time, he also studied theology and religious studies at the University of Leeds and graduated with a Bachelor of Arts (BA) degree in 1982.

Ordained ministry
Nunn was ordained in the Church of England, made a deacon in 1983 during a service at Ripon Cathedral. He was ordained a priest at Petertide 1984 (1 July) by David Young, Bishop of Ripon, at Ripon Cathedral. Between 1983 and 1987, he served his curacy at St James the Great, Manston, Leeds. He was then chaplain of Agnes Stewart Church of England High School and curate then vicar at (All Saints') Richmond Hill.

From 1995 to 1999, Nunn was chaplain and personal assistant to Roy Williamson, Bishop of Southwark. From 1999, he was a residentiary canon of Southwark Cathedral. From 1999 to 2000, he was vice-provost and precentor. In 2000, all primae inter pares of cathedral clergy became known as deans; previously some heads of chapters were titled provost while some were titled dean. Therefore, from 2000 to 2012, he was sub-dean and precentor at Southwark Cathedral. On 21 January 2012, he was installed as Dean of Southwark.

Nunn has been an elected member of the General Synod of the Church of England since 2005. He was chaplain to the Synod from 2011 to 2012, and has been a member of its Panel of Chairs since 2016.

Since 2008, Nunn has been Rector General of the Society of Catholic Priests. He is Chaplain General of the Company of Servers, an Anglican society for lay people that is connected to the Society of Catholic Priests.

Nunn is an honorary chaplain of a number of livery companies of the City of London. Since 2000, he has been an honorary chaplain of the Launderers' Company. He is also an honorary chaplain of the Innholders' Company, as well as a member of the Glaziers' Company.

Nunn has announced his intention to retire effective 4 July 2023.

Personal life
Nunn is gay and has a partner.

Styles
The Reverend Andrew Nunn (1983–1999)
The Reverend Canon Andrew Nunn (1999–2012)
The Very Reverend Andrew Nunn (2012–present)

References

External links 

 Nunn's General Synod blog

1957 births
20th-century English Anglican priests
21st-century English Anglican priests
Alumni of the University of Leeds
Alumni of the College of the Resurrection
English Anglo-Catholics
Provosts and Deans of Southwark
Living people
Anglo-Catholic clergy
Members of the General Synod of the Church of England
LGBT Anglican clergy